A 24-hour run is a form of ultramarathon, in which a competitor runs as far as they can in 24 hours.  They are typically held on 1- to 2-mile loops or occasionally 400-meter tracks.

Top runners will often run  or more, depending on conditions, and the best can go beyond . Some participants will have a crew to help them, but others just set up a camp with all the gear and supplies they need near the starting area to access each loop. Often 24-hour events are combined with 6-, 12-, and 48-hour events.  24-hour runs have also been held in relay formats, with runners completing a mile each in succession for 24 hours.  Often these events are not internationally sanctioned, and are more for charitable purposes.

The world records for the event on all surfaces are 270.116 km (167.842 miles) for women, set by Camille Herron of USA in 2019, and 319.614 km (198.598 miles) for men, set by Aleksandr Sorokin of Lithuania in 2022.

Competitions 
The first international championship was held February 3–4, 1990 in Milton Keynes, England. A full continental championship was formed in 1992 as the IAU 24 Hour European Championships.

The IAU 24 Hour World Championship is the pinnacle of competition in the 24-hour run. The first IAU Individual Track Championships were held in San Giovanni Lupatoto, Verona, Italy on 22–23 September 2001.

The German website DUV lists 160 24-hour races that were scheduled for 2012, a figure that has doubled over the last 10 years. The longest running 24-hour race is the Self-Transcendence 24 Hour Race Ottawa, Canada which began in 1981.

See also 
 One hour run
 12-hour run
 Centurion Walk

References 



Endurance games
Ultramarathons
Road running distances
Events in track and field